SDSD may refer to:
South Dakota School for the Deaf
South Delta School District